Ricardo de la Cierva y Hoces (9 November 1926 – 19 November 2015) was a Spanish historian and politician.

A native of Madrid, de la Cierva served the constituency of Murcia in the Congress of Deputies and Senate from 1977 to 1982. He was the Minister of Culture for nine months in 1980. Originally a member of the Union of the Democratic Centre, de la Cierva switched to the People's Alliance in February 1982, later stepped down from the Cortes Generales upon the end of his term in August of that year. De la Cierva won the second prize of the 1988 Premio Planeta de Novela, and also wrote for the magazine Época. He died in 2015.

References

1926 births
2015 deaths
People's Alliance (Spain) politicians
Union of the Democratic Centre (Spain) politicians
Government ministers of Spain
20th-century Spanish writers
20th-century male writers
21st-century Spanish writers
20th-century Spanish historians
Members of the 1st Congress of Deputies (Spain)
Members of the Senate of Spain
Writers from Madrid
Politicians from Madrid
Historians of the Spanish Civil War
Anti-Masonry in Spain
Francoists